Chalybion zimmermanni, known generally as the Zimmermann's mud wasp or blue mud dauber wasp, is a species of thread-waisted wasp in the family Sphecidae.

Subspecies
These three subspecies belong to the species Chalybion zimmermanni:
 Chalybion zimmermanni aztecum (de Saussure, 1867) (Aztec mud wasp)
 Chalybion zimmermanni peninsularum Bohart & Menke, 1963
 Chalybion zimmermanni zimmermanni Dahlbom, 1843

References

Sphecidae
Articles created by Qbugbot
Insects described in 1843